Tytus Howard (born May 23, 1996) is an American football offensive tackle and guard for the Houston Texans of the National Football League (NFL). He played college football at Alabama State.

Professional career

Howard was drafted by the Houston Texans in the first round (23rd overall) of the 2019 NFL Draft. He is the first Alabama State player to be selected in the first round of an NFL Draft. He was placed on injured reserve on November 30, 2019. He started eight games as a rookie, seven at right tackle and one at left guard.

In 2020, Howard started the first 14 games at right tackle before being placed on injured reserve on December 23, 2020.

The Texans picked up the fifth-year option on Howard's contract on May 2, 2022.

References

External links
Alabama State Hornets bio

Houston Texans bio

1996 births
Living people
People from Monroeville, Alabama
Players of American football from Alabama
American football offensive tackles
American football offensive guards
Alabama State Hornets football players
Houston Texans players